James Whalen may refer to:

James Whalen (businessman) (1869–1929), Canadian businessman
James J. Whalen (1927–2001), American psychologist
James Whalen (American football) (born 1977), former American football player
Jimmy Whalen (James Henry Whalen, 1920–1944), fighter pilot and recipient of the Distinguished Flying Cross